Myrtle Grove is a census-designated place (CDP) in Escambia County, Florida, United States. The population was 15,870 at the 2010 census. It is part of the Pensacola–Ferry Pass–Brent Metropolitan Statistical Area.

Geography
Myrtle Grove is located at  (30.419997, -87.302492).

The boundaries of the CDP include an area near Blue Angel Parkway to the west, Bellview to the north, Warrington to the south, and West Pensacola to the east.

Demographics

As of the census of 2000, there were 17,211 people, 6,196 households, and 4,126 families residing in the CDP. The racial makeup of the CDP was 75.24% White, 13.49% African American, 0.89% Native American, 5.01% Asian, 0.30% Pacific Islander, 1.60% from other races, and 3.47% from two or more races. Hispanic or Latino of any race were 4.30% of the population.

There were 6,196 households, out of which 30.3% had children under the age of 18 living with them, 49.3% were married couples living together, 13.5% had a female householder with no husband present, and 33.4% were non-families. 26.8% of all households were made up of individuals, and 9.3% had someone living alone who was 65 years of age or older. The average household size was 2.46 and the average family size was 2.96.

In the CDP, the population was spread out, with 22.2% under the age of 18, 15.9% from 18 to 24, 29.5% from 25 to 44, 19.0% from 45 to 64, and 13.3% who were 65 years of age or older. The median age was 32 years. For every 100 females, there were 104.4 males. For every 100 females age 18 and over, there were 103.2 males.

The median income for a household in the CDP was $33,601, and the median income for a family was $39,646. Males had a median income of $26,737 versus $21,689 for females. The per capita income for the CDP was $18,268. About 11.7% of families and 14.2% of the population were below the poverty line, including 22.3% of those under age 18 and 9.8% of those age 65 or over.

Education
Myrtle Grove is part of the Escambia County School District, which serves the entire county. Myrtle Grove is the home to Escambia High School.

References

Pensacola metropolitan area
Census-designated places in Escambia County, Florida
Census-designated places in Florida